The 2003 Sparkassen Cup (tennis) was a women's tennis tournament played on indoor hard courts in Leipzig, Germany. It was part of the Tier II category of the 2003 WTA Tour. It was the 14th and last edition of the tournament and was held from 22 September until 28 September 2003.

Singles main draw entrants

Seeds

 1 Rankings are as of 15 September 2003.

Other entrants
The following players received wildcards into the singles main draw:
  Elke Clijsters
  Anna-Lena Grönefeld
  Barbara Schett

The following players received entry from the singles qualifying draw:

  Els Callens
  Sandra Kleinová
  Jelena Kostanić
  María Vento-Kabchi

Doubles main draw entrants

Seeds

1 Rankings as of 15 September 2003.

Other entrants
The following pairs received wildcards into the doubles main draw:
  Vanessa Henke /  Caroline Schneider

The following players received entry from the singles qualifying draw:
  Anikó Kapros /  Lydia Steinbach

Finals

Singles

  Anastasia Myskina defeated  Justine Henin-Hardenne, 3–6, 6–3, 6–3

Doubles

  Svetlana Kuznetsova /  Martina Navratilova defeated  Elena Likhovtseva /  Nadia Petrova, 3–6, 6–1, 6–3

External links
 ITF tournament edition details
 Tournament draws

Sparkassen Cup
Sparkassen Cup (tennis)
German